The 2020 Gator Bowl was a college football bowl game played on January 2, 2020, with kickoff at 7:00 p.m. EST on ESPN. It was the 75th edition of the Gator Bowl, and was one of the 2019–20 bowl games concluding the 2019 FBS football season. Sponsored by financial technology company TaxSlayer, the game was officially known as the TaxSlayer Gator Bowl.

Teams
The game matched the Indiana Hoosiers from the Big Ten Conference and the Tennessee Volunteers from the Southeastern Conference (SEC). This was the second meeting between the programs; they previously met in the January 1988 Peach Bowl, won by Tennessee, 27–22.

Indiana Hoosiers

Indiana entered the game with an 8–4 record (5–4 in conference). They finished in fourth place in the Big Ten's East Division. The Hoosiers' four losses were all to ranked opponents: Ohio State, Michigan State, Penn State, and Michigan. This was Indiana's first Gator Bowl appearance.

Tennessee Volunteers

Tennessee entered the game with a 7–5 record (5–3 in conference). They finished in third place in the SEC's East Division. The Volunteers lost to all three ranked opponents they faced: Florida, Georgia, and Alabama. After starting their season 2–5, the Volunteers entered the bowl on a five-game winning streak. This was Tennessee's seventh Gator Bowl; the Volunteers had a record of 4–2 in prior appearances.

Game summary

Statistics

References

External links

Game statistics at statbroadcast.com

Gator Bowl
Gator Bowl
Indiana Hoosiers football bowl games
Tennessee Volunteers football bowl games
Gator Bowl
Gator Bowl
21st century in Jacksonville, Florida